Tausug is an Austronesian language spoken in the province of Sulu in the Philippines and in the eastern area of the state of Sabah, Malaysia, by the Tausūg people. It is widely spoken in the Sulu Archipelago (Sulu, Tawi-Tawi, and Basilan), the Zamboanga Peninsula (Zamboanga del Norte, Zamboanga Sibugay, Zamboanga del Sur, and Zamboanga City), southern Palawan, and Malaysia (eastern Sabah).

Tausug has some lexical similarities or near similarities with Surigaonon language of the provinces Surigao del Norte, Surigao del Sur, and Agusan del Sur and with the Butuanon language of Agusan del Norte; it has also some vocabulary similarities with Sugbuanon, Bicolano, and with other Philippine languages. Many Malay and Arabic words are found in Bahasa Sūg.

Nomenclature
In English, the language is primarily known as Tausug (i.e., Tausug language "language of the Tausug people"). The local name of the language is bahasa Sūg (Sulu language). The term Tausūg (meaning "people of Sulu") is derived from two words: tau ("person") and Sūg (The transformation of "Sūk", itself the contraction of Sūlūk).  Thus, in Tausug, Tausug refers to people while Bahasa Sug refers to the language. Several scholars postulate that "Sūlūk" derives from "Ahl ul-Sūlūk", or "people of the path (to Allah)," in reference to the Islamic missionaries who arrived to spread the religion of Islam. Meanwhile, a similar sounding word "sug", which means "water-current", has been given by a number of writers as the etymologic source of the term; the two words, even if similarly pronounced, are not related. In the past, the language has also been simply referred to using the generic term "Moro".

Classification

Tausug is an Austronesian language. It is classified by linguists as being a member of the Bisayan languages family, which includes Cebuano and Waray.  In particular, it has many similarities with the Surigaonon language of the provinces Surigao del Norte, Surigao del Sur and Agusan del Sur and with the Butuanon language of Agusan del Norte – both spoken in northeastern Mindanao; hence, Zorc (1977) groups these three languages as part of a "South Bisayan" grouping.

Speakers

Tausug is primarily spoken in the Sulu Archipelago, which aside from the island of Sulu, also includes the Tawi-Tawi chain of islands and the island of Basilan. It is a lingua franca spoken in different areas/islands of the archipelago.

Due to migration, the language is also spoken alongside other local languages in the Zamboanga Peninsula (e.g., Cebuano and Chavacano), which includes the provinces of Zamboanga del Norte, Zamboanga Sibugay and Zamboanga del Sur and Zamboanga City. It is also spoken in Southern Palawan and in Eastern Sabah, Malaysia.

Phonology

Vowels
Tausug has three vowel phonemes: /a/, /i/, /u/, with phonemic length (e.g. īpun, "shrimp" vs. ipun, "tooth"). Stress is not phonemic and usually occurs on the final syllable.

The vowel phonemes have a broad range of allophones:
/a/: 
/i/: 
/u/: 

Tausug has expectedly developed some variations in accent and vocabulary from one area to another, but there are two basic dialects characterized by differences with regard to vowel sounds. The "Gimbahanun" (literally means people from the farm) speakers, the residents of the out-of-town rural areas, use four vowels: /a/, /i/, /u/ and /ə/, the last vowel representing schwa sound or "obscure u", a retention from Proto-Philippine and Proto-Bisayan. The "Parianun", the residents of the urban areas, use only three vowel phonemes: /a/, /i/, /u/,; the loss of /ə/ is common in many Bisayan and other Philippine languages.

Consonants
The consonant phonemes are:

Allophones:
 /b/: per default , but  between vowels
 /g/: per default , but  between vowels
 /h/: per default , but  between vowels
 /r/: per default , but  before /m,n,g,k/

Medial gemination (of all non-glottal consonants) is phonemic.

Grammar

Pronouns

Personal pronouns
Tausug has three pronouns sets:

Demonstratives

Case markers
The case markers of Tausug are:

Non-subject undergoers take the oblique marker when definite or a proper noun, but indefinite common nouns take the genitive marker sin.
Hi Nasul in kimaun ha mampallam. "It was Nasul who ate the mango."
Nagdakdak sin baju' in manga bujang. "The maidens washed clothes."

Existentials
The positive existential ("there is") is aun, the negative existential ("there is none") is way.

Interrogative words

Verbs 
Verbs in Tausug are inflected for focus and aspect.

Affixes expressing ability:

Numbers
Tausug numerals:

Writing system

Tausug is today primarily written using the Latin alphabet. Historically, it had previously been written using the Arabic alphabet. The script used was inspired by the use of Jawi in writing the Malay language.

An example of the Arabic alphabet in writing the Tausūg language:
 Latin script – Wayruun tuhan malayngkan Allāh, hi Muhammad ing (in) rasūl sin Allāh
 Arabic script – وَيْـرُٷنْ تُـهَـنْ مَـلَـيِـڠْـكَـن هَالله، هِـمُـحَـمَّـدْ ئِـڠ رَسُـولْ سِـڠ الله
 English translation – There is no god but Allah, Muhammad is the Messenger of Allah

The Arabic script used to write Tausug differs in some aspects from the script used for Arabic and in the Jawi script used for Malay. One of the main differences is in the way that word-initial vowels are written.

In Arabic, /in/ is (إن); in Jawi (Malay), it is (ان). In Tausug, it is (ئِن). The Tausug Arabic script utilizes the letter yā' with a hamza (ئ) to represent a short vowel. If a kasra (ئِ) is added, it becomes an 'i' sound. If a fatha (ئَ) is added, it becomes an 'a' sound. If a damma (ئُ) is added, it becomes a 'u' sound.

Latin

Arabic

Examples

Loanwords

Many Tausug words derive from the Arabic language.

Some examples of Arabic words in Tausug are

Tausug words derived from Sanskrit

Notes

See also
 Languages of the Philippines
 Yakan
 Bikol
 Cebuano
 Chavacano
 Hiligaynon
 Kapampangan
 Ilocano
 Pangasinan
 Bisayan languages
 Waray language

References

Bibliography

Further reading

External links 

 Publications in Tausūg and other Philippine languages
 Tausug-English Dictionary of SIL International. online version accessible from Webonary.org.
 Tausug at Wiktionary
 Tausug Language by Dr. Carl G. Rubino
 Bansa.org Tausug Dictionary 
 Tausug English Glossary Search for common Tausug Words
 Tausug 101 by Anak Iluh

Visayan languages
Languages of Sulu
Languages of Tawi-Tawi
Languages of Basilan
Languages of Indonesia
Languages of Sabah
Languages of Malaysia